The 1986 Taça de Portugal Final was the final match of the 1985–86 Taça de Portugal, which was the 46th season of the Taça de Portugal, the premier Portuguese football cup competition organized by the Portuguese Football Federation (FPF). The match was played on 27 April 1986 at the Estádio Nacional in Oeiras, and opposed two Primeira Liga sides: Belenenses and Benfica. Benfica defeated Belenenses 2–0 to claim the Taça de Portugal for a twentieth time.

In Portugal, the final was televised live on RTP. As a result of Benfica winning the Taça de Portugal, the Águias qualified for the 1986 Supertaça Cândido de Oliveira where they took on 1985–86 Primeira Divisão winners Porto.

Match

Details

References

1986
Taca
C.F. Os Belenenses matches
S.L. Benfica matches